2015 Fotokol attack may refer to:

Fotokol bombings
Fotokol massacre